In an alphabetic writing system, a silent letter is a letter that, in a particular word, does not correspond to any sound in the word's pronunciation. In linguistics, a silent letter is often symbolised with a null sign . Null is an unpronounced or unwritten segment. The symbol resembles the Scandinavian letter Ø and other symbols.

English

One of the noted difficulties of English spelling is a high number of silent letters. Edward Carney distinguishes different kinds of "silent" letters, which present differing degrees of difficulty to readers.
 Auxiliary letters which, with another letter, constitute digraphs, i.e. two letters combined which represent a single phoneme. These may further be categorized as:
 "Exocentric" digraphs, where the sound of the digraph is different from that of either of its constituent letters. These are rarely considered "silent". Examples:
These are the default spellings for the relevant sounds and present no special difficulty for readers or writers.
These may be considered irregular for writers, but less difficult for readers.
 "Endocentric" digraphs, where the sound of the digraph is the same as that of one of its constituent letters. These include:
Doubling due to suffixation or inflection is regular; otherwise, it may present difficulty to writers (e.g. accommodate is often misspelled), but not to readers.
 The discontiguous digraphs, whose second element is "magic e", e.g.  in rate (cf. rat),  in fine (cf. fin). This is the regular way to represent "long" vowels in the last syllable of a morpheme.
These may be difficult for writers and sometimes also for readers.
 Dummy letters with no relation to neighboring letters and no correspondence in pronunciation:
 Some are inert letters, which are sounded in a cognate word: e.g.  in damn (cf. damnation);  in phlegm (cf. phlegmatic);  in practically (cf. practical);  in ballet (cf. balletic). If the cognate is obvious, it may aid writers in spelling, but mislead readers in pronunciation.
 The rest are empty letters, which never have a sound, e.g.,  in honor,  in answer,  in Sarah,  in island,  in subtle. These may present the greatest difficulty to writers and often to readers, as well.

The distinction between "endocentric" digraphs and empty letters is somewhat arbitrary.

Not all silent letters are completely redundant:
 Silent letters can distinguish between homophones, e.g. in/inn; be/bee; lent/leant. This is an aid to readers already familiar with both words.
 Silent letters may give an insight into the meaning or origin of a word; e.g. vineyard suggests vines more than the phonetic *vinyard would.
 Silent letters may help the reader to stress the correct syllable (compare physics to physiques). The final  in giraffe gives a clue to the second-syllable stress, where *giraf might suggest initial-stress.

Silent letters arise in several ways:
 Sound changes occurring without a spelling change. The digraph  was pronounced  in Middle English in such words as light.
 Compound words are often simplified in pronunciation, while their spelling remains the same. For example, cupboard and breakfast were once pronounced as written, but were then simplified over time. The words forehead and waistcoat have largely reverted to their spelling pronunciations, but were once pronounced *forrid and *weskit, respectively.
 Occasionally, spurious letters are consciously inserted in spelling to reflect etymology (real or imagined). The  in debt and doubt (from French dette, doute) was inserted to match Latin cognates like debit and dubitable. A silent  was inserted in isle (Norman French ile, Old French isle, from Latin insula; cognate to isolate) and then extended to the unrelated word island. The  in ptarmigan was apparently suggested by Greek words such as pteron ('wing').

Since accent and pronunciation differ, letters may be silent for some speakers, but not others. In non-rhotic accents,  is silent in such words as hard, feathered; in h-dropping accents,  is silent. A speaker may or may not pronounce  in often, the first  in Antarctic,  in sandwich, etc.

Differences between British English and American English

Pronunciation

In the US, the h in herb is silent (an herb), but in the UK, it is pronounced (a herb). The same is true for the l in solder.

In parts of the UK, the a in dictionary and secretary is silent, but in the US, it is pronounced.

Spelling

In US spellings, silent letters are sometimes omitted (e.g., acknowledgment / UK acknowledgement, ax / UK axe, catalog / UK catalogue, program / UK programme outside computer contexts), but not always (e.g., dialogue is the standard spelling in the US and the UK; dialog is regarded as a US variant; the spelling axe is also often used in the US). In most words, silent letters are written in both styles (e.g., debt, guard, house).

Other Germanic languages

Danish
The Danish language has different letters that can be silent.

The letter  is silent in the conjunction af.

The letter  is silent in the conjunctions og and også.

The letter  is usually (but not necessarily) silent if preceded by a consonant, as in en mand (‘a man’), blind (‘blind’).

Faroese

The Faroese language has two silent letters.

The letter   is almost always silent. It is rendered in orthography for historical reasons (e.g.  'father' , cf. Old Norse ). In some cases, however, the letter  is pronounced , as in  'the weather' .

The letter   (i.e. continuant of Old Norse ) is usually silent between vowels or when following a vowel before a pause (e.g.  'day' , cf. Old Norse  ;  'I' , cf. Old Norse ). Use of the silent letter  in Faroese is the same as for the letter edd - it is written for historical reasons as Faroese orthography was based on normalised spelling of Old Norse and Icelandic language.

German
In German, silent letters are rare apart from word-internal  and the digraph .

Silent h is used in German to indicate vowel length or hiatus. This h is almost regularly added at the end of inflectable word stems, e.g. Kuh (cow), Stroh (straw), drehen (to turn, stem dreh-). There is only a fairly small number of exceptions to this, mostly nouns in -ee or -ie (see below), apart from isolated cases such as säen (to sow).

Otherwise silent h may be written before the letters l, m, n, r as in nehmen (to take), Stuhl (chair), Zahn (tooth). This latter use is highly irregular, however, and there are just as many words where the h is missing.

Historically, this use of silent h goes back to the Middle High German consonant , which became silent in words like sehen (to see), zehn (ten). By analogy it was then also used in words that had no such h in Middle High German. The majority of silent h’s in modern German are analogical rather than etymological.

The long i-sound  is usually written , with a silent , as in viel (much), spielen (to play), Wien ('Vienna'), and hundreds of other words.

In native German words this spelling is fairly unambiguous. Some words of foreign origin also behave like native words, e.g. Kurier, Papier, Turnier and all verbs ending  (e.g. appellieren, organisieren). 
In other foreign words, however, the  after  may be pronounced, e.g. Ambiente, Hygiene, Klient, or names like Daniela, Gabriel, Triest.

Words ending in  can be particularly tricky to learners: There are generally two possibilities: (1.) when the final  is stressed, it represents long  as in Zeremonie ; (2.) when the preceding vowel is stressed,  represents the separate vowels  as in Folie . 
To the first group belong e.g. Akademie, Allergie, Amnesie, Amnestie, Apathie, Artillerie, Batterie, Blasphemie, Chemie, Chirurgie, Demokratie, Energie, Epidemie, -gamie, Garantie, Genie, Geometrie, -grafie/-graphie, Harmonie, Hysterie, Infanterie, Ironie, Kavallerie, Kompanie, Kopie, -logie, Liturgie,  Magie, Manie, Marie, Melodie, Monotonie, Nostalgie, Orthopädie, Partie, Phantasie, Philosophie, Poesie, Psychiatrie, Rhapsodie, Sinfonie, -skopie, Theorie, Therapie, Utopie. 
To the second group belong e.g. Akazie, Aktie, Amalie, Begonie, Emilie, Familie, Folie, Geranie, Grazie, Hortensie, Hostie, Immobilie, Kastanie, Komödie, Kurie, Lilie, Linie, Orgie, Otilie, Pinie,  Serie, Studie, Tragödie, Zäzilie. 
Note that in female names there is a third category of words stressed on the antepenult, where  also represents , e.g. Amelie, Leonie, Nathalie, Rosalie, Stefanie, Valerie (all stressed on the first syllable).

A special case arises when the  after  is a grammatical ending. In this case it is always pronounced. Therefore Zeremonie becomes Zeremonien  in the plural, and the same is true of all other nouns in group 1 above. The noun Knie is pronounced  when it is singular, but usually  when it is plural. Spermien is plural of Spermium, hence also with a pronounced . Country names in -ien can also be joined to this group: Australien, Brasilien, Indien, Kroatien, Serbien, Slowenien.

Other letters
Other silent letters occur mainly in borrowings from French and other modern languages, e.g. Porträt (portrait), Korps (corps).

Informally, the letter  may be silent in function words like ist (is), jetzt (now), nicht (not), and otherwise in clusters like Gedächtnis (memory), Kunststück (piece of art). These t’s are commonly silent in everyday speech, but will be retained in careful, formal parlance.

Romance languages

French

Silent letters are common in French, including the last letter of most words.

Vowels
Furthermore, the schwa can prevent an awkward ending of a word ending in a consonant and a liquid (peuple, sucre).

Consonants

  is silent outside of the digraph  and loanwords such as hat or hate. Numerous doubled consonants exist; French does not distinguish doubled consonants from single consonants in pronunciation as Italian does. A marked distinction exists between a single and doubled : doubled  is always voiceless , while an intervocalic single  is voiced .

The nasal consonants  and  when final or preceding a consonant ordinarily nasalize a preceding vowel but are not themselves pronounced (faim, tomber, vin, vendre).

But even this rule has its exceptions: final  is usually pronounced /e/ (=) rather than the expected /ɛʀ/. Final  is silent after  even in a diphthong (œil, appareil, travail). Final -ent is silent as a third-person plural verb ending, though it is pronounced in other cases.

Final consonants that might be silent in other contexts (finally or before another consonant) may seem to reappear in pronunciation in liaison: ils ont  "they have", as opposed to ils sont  "they are"; liaison is the retention (between words in certain syntactic relationships) of a historical sound otherwise lost, and often has grammatical or lexical significance.

Italian

Silent  is also used in forms of the verb avere ('have') – ho, hai and hanno – to distinguish these from their homophones o ('or'), ai ('to the') and anno ('year'). The letter  is also silent at the beginning of words borrowed from other languages, such as hotel.

Spanish

Despite being rather phonemic, Spanish orthography retains some silent letters:
  is silent outside of the digraph  and loanwords such as hámster or hachís.

Greek

Slavic languages

Czech

In the vast majority of cases, Czech pronunciation follows the spelling. There are only four exceptions:

D

For example: dcera (daughter) and in srdce (heart)

/j/ + consonant clusters in some words

In most present forms of the verb být ("to be"), namely jsem, jsi, jsme, jste and jsou (i.e. all persons but the 3rd person singular je), the initial cluster /js/ is regularly simplified to a mere /s/. This pronunciation is considered correct and neutral when the verb is unstressed and used as an auxiliary. When stressed or used lexically, only the full /js/ pronunciation is considered correct. In casual speech, however, a few other highly frequent words commonly undergo similar simplification, namely all present forms of jít ("to walk") beginning with /jd/ (that is jdu, jdeš, jde, jdeme, jdete, jdou), the noun jméno ("name") and the verb jmenovat (se) ("to name, to (be) call(ed)").

Russian

Several words in Russian omit written consonants when spoken. For example, "чувствовать" (chuvstvovat') is pronounced [ˈt͡ɕustvəvətʲ] and "солнце" (solntse) is pronounced [ˈsont͡sə].

Russian letter ъ  has no phonetic value and functions as a separation sign. Before the spelling reform of 1918 this hard sign was written at the end of each word when following a non-palatal consonant.

Semitic languages

In Hebrew, almost all cases of silent letters are silent aleph – א. Many words that have a silent aleph in Hebrew, have an equivalent word in Arabic language, that is written with a mater lectionis alif –ا ; a letter that indicates the long vowel "aa". Examples:
 The Hebrew word for "no" is לֹא (sounds like "lo", spelled like "loa") and the Arabic word for "no" is لاَ (sounds and spelled like "laa").
 The Hebrew word for "left side" is שְׂמֹאל (sounds like "smol", spelled like "smoal") and the Arabic word for "north" is شَمَال (sounds and spelled like "shamaal").
 The Hebrew word for "head" is רֹאשׁ (sounds like "rosh", spelled like "roash") and the Arabic word for "head" is رَأس (sounds and spelled like "ra's").

The explanation for this phenomenon is that the Hebrew language had a sound change of all the mater lectionis aleph letters into silent ones (see Canaanite shift). Due to that sound change, in Hebrew language, there are only two kinds of aleph - the glottal stop (/ʔ/) and the silent one, while in Arabic language all three kinds still exist.

The silent Arabic alif is marked with a wasla sign above it (see picture), in order to differentiate it from the other kinds of alifs. An Arabic alif turns silent, if it fulfils three conditions: it must be in a beginning of a word, the word must not be the first one of the sentence, and the word must belong to one of the following groups:
 Verbs that start with the prefix "ʔi-", due to their conjugation and derived stem.
 Ten specific nouns that begin with "ʔ":اسم, است, ابن/ابنة, اثنان/اثنتان, امرؤ/امرأة, اَيمن الله/اَيْم الله. Some of these words have a Hebrew word equivalent, and that equivalent had totally lost the beginning aleph. Examples: اسم (ʔism), meaning "a name" (in Maltese the word isem), sounds like "ism" if it is in the beginning of the sentence and "sm" if not; its Hebrew equivalent is שֵׁם (shem). إبن (ʔibn) (in Maltese the word iben), meaning "a son", sounds like "ibn" if it is in the beginning of the sentence and "bn" if not; its Hebrew equivalent is בֵּן (ben), in Maltese bin.
 The alif of the word اَل (ʔal), meaning "the" - sounds like "al" if it is in the beginning of the sentence and "l" if not.

Besides the alif of the Arabic word ال (ʔal, meaning "the"), its lām (the letter L) can also get silent. It gets silent if the noun that word is related to, starts with a "sun letter". A sun letter is a letter that indicates a consonant that is produced by stopping the air in the front part of the mouth (not including the consonant M). The Hebrew equivalent to the Arabic word ال (ʔal, meaning "the") had totally lost its L.

In Maltese għ can be silent e.g. għar - meaning cave - and pronounced "ahr", or a voiced HH if it is followed by the or if it is at the end of a word e.g. qlugħ.

Uralic languages

The Estonian and Finnish languages use double letters for long vowels and geminate consonants.

Turkish

In the Turkish language,  often has no sound of its own, but lengthens the preceding vowel, for example in dağ ("mountain") . In other surroundings, it may be pronounced as a glide.

Persian 
In Persian, there are two instances of silent letters:

 The letter he after a short vowel, unless in a monosyllabic word, has no sound of its own. It is only written because according to spelling rules a word cannot end in a short vowel.
 The Silent Vav is always written but not spoken in Standard Persian. It used to represent the labialization of the voiceless velar fricative, which no longer exists in the standard dialect, making it an archaic remnant of the old standards of pronunciation.

Indic languages

Unconventional to Sanskrit and Proto-Indo-European root languages, some Indic languages have silent letters. Among Dravidian languages, Tamil and Malayalam have certain distinct styles of keeping few of their letters silent.

Tamil

Tamil is a classical language phonetically characterized by allophones, approximants, nasals and glottalised sounds. Some words, however, have silent letters in them. The words அஃது (while that is), and அஃதன் (that) contain the Āytam or '', which is not pronounced in Modern Tamil. It is explained in the Tolkāppiyam that āytam could have glottalised the sounds it was combined with, though some may argue it sounded more like the Arabic ''. That being said, modern words like ஆஃபிஸ் (Office) use '' and '' in sequence to represent the  sound, as the āytam is nowadays also used to transcribe it and other foreign phonemes.

Another convention in Middle Tamil (Sen-Tamil) is the use of silent vowels to address a mark of respect when beginning proper nouns. The Ramayana was one such text where the word Ramayana in Tamil always began with '', as in இராமாயணம், though it was not pronounced. The name கோபாலன் was so written as உகோபாலன் prefixed with an ''.

Malayalam

Inheriting elision, approximants and allophones from Tamil, in Malayalam, except for Sanskrit words, words ending in the vowel '' become silent at the end and if not compounded with words succeeding them, replace the '' vowel by the schwa . However, it is considered disrespectful to change this pronunciation in the simple present verbs, when using imperatives and using what can be termed as Imperative-Active voice in Malayalam, where the second person is respectfully addressed with his or her name instead of നീ (you) or നിങ്ങൽ (yourselves). (Finish!) which sounds like an order.

Zhuang-Tai languages

Thai 
Thai has a deep orthography like English and French. Unlike the two languages, however, the Thai script is an abugida rather than a true alphabet. Nonetheless, silent consonants, vowels, and even syllables are common in Thai. Thai has many loanwords from Sanskrit and Pali, and rather than spell aforementioned words according to Thai phonics, the script tends to maintain the etymological spellings. Another example is the Thai word มนตร์, which is sometimes written as mantra like it would be in Sanskrit, but it is only pronounced  in Thai. Though the second syllable is pronounced in Sanskrit, it is completely absent when pronouncing the word in Thai.

However, some letters written before low class consonants become silent and turn the low class syllable into a high class one. For example, even though the high class letter   is used to write the sound /h/, if the letter comes before a low class letter in a syllable, the letter will become , which will make the letter silent and it will turn the syllable into a high class syllable. For example, the word  is a low class syllable because its initial consonant is a low class consonant. The syllable is pronounced  (with a long vowel and mid tone) and it means "field". However, the word  is a high class syllable, despite it containing a low class consonant in the onset. The syllable is pronounced  (with a long vowel and a rising tone) and it means "thick".

Lao 
Like Thai, Lao also has a letter that becomes silent if it comes before a low class consonant. The letter is ho sung ຫ, which would represent the sound /h/ if it were not paired with another low class consonant. However, unlike Thai, the digraphs beginning with the aforementioned letter can sometimes be written as a ligature.

Zhuang 

In the standard Zhuang language, written in the Latin script, the last letter of every syllable is typically silent due to it representing the tone of the syllable. The digraphs mb and nd also have silent letters, representing the phonemes ɓ and ɗ respectively.

Korean 
In the Hangul Orthography of the Korean language, the letter ⟨ㅇ⟩ is silent when written in the syllable-initial position, and represents the sound /ŋ/ when written in the syllable-final position. For example, in the word 안녕 (meaning "hello"), composed of the letters "ㅇㅏㄴㄴㅕㅇ", the first ⟨ㅇ⟩ is silent, and the last ⟨ㅇ⟩ is pronounced as /ŋ/. The reason for this can be found in 15th-century Hangul orthography. In the 15th century, the letter ⟨ㅇ⟩ originally represented /∅~ɣ/ (a lenited form of ㄱ /k/), while the letter ⟨ㆁ⟩ unconditionally represented /ŋ/. But because in Middle Korean phonology, ⟨ㆁ⟩ was not allowed in syllable-initial position, and ⟨ㅇ⟩ was not allowed in syllable-final position, it formed a complementary distribution of the two letters. Because of this and due to the fact that the letters look very much alike, the two letters merged.

Korean's syllable structure is CGVC, and Korean's writing system, Hangul, reflects this structure. The only possible consonant cluster in a single syllable must contain a glide and they must occur in the onset. However, sometimes a cluster of two consonants are written after the vowel in a syllable. In such situations, if the next syllable begins with a vowel sound, then the second consonant becomes the first sound of the next syllable. However, if the next syllable begins with a consonant sound, then one of the consonants in the cluster will be silent (sometimes causing fortition in the following consonant). For example, the word 얇다 (meaning "thin") is written as (Yale: yalp.ta), but the word is pronounced as if it was written yal.tta because the second syllable begins with a consonant sound. However, the word 얇아서 (also meaning "thin") is written as (Yale: yalp.a.se) and it is pronounced as yal.pa.se because the second syllable begins with a vowel sound.

Mongolian 
Interestingly, the native Mongolian script has much more orthographic depth than Mongolian Cyrillic. For example, the letter Gh or γ (ᠭ) is silent if it is between two of the same vowel letters. In that case, the silent consonant letter combines to two written vowel into one long vowel. For example, the Mongolian word Qaγan (ᠬᠠᠭᠠᠨ) should be pronounced Qaan (ᠬᠠᠠᠨ). In Mongolian Cyrillic, however, it is spelled хаан (haan), closer to the actual pronunciation of the word. Words in the Mongolian script can also have silent vowels as well. For Mongolian name of the city Hohhot, it is spelled Kökeqota (ᠬᠥᠬᠡᠬᠣᠲᠠ) in Mongolian script, but in Cyrillic, it is spelled Хөх хот (Höh hot), closer towards the actual pronunciation of the word.

See also
Apheresis (linguistics)
Elision
List of names in English with counterintuitive pronunciations, many with multiple silent letters.
Schwa deletion in Indo-Aryan languages, explains rules of Modern Indo-Aryan languages that delete the schwa sound.
Silent e
Silent k
Syncope (phonology)
Three-letter rule, the source of some common English silent letters.

References

 
Spelling
English orthography
Letter